Deep focus is a photographic and cinematographic technique using a large depth of field. Depth of field is the front-to-back range of focus in an image, or how much of it appears sharp and clear. In deep focus, the foreground, middle ground, and background are all in focus.

Deep focus is normally achieved by choosing a small aperture. Since the aperture of a camera determines how much light enters through the lens, achieving deep focus requires a bright scene or long exposure. A wide-angle lens also makes a larger portion of the image appear sharp.

It is also possible to achieve the illusion of deep focus with optical tricks (split-focus diopter) or by compositing two or more images together.

The opposite of deep focus is shallow focus, in which the plane of the image that is in focus is very shallow. For example, the foreground might be in focus while the middle-ground and background are out-of-focus. When avoiding deep focus is used specifically for aesthetic effect—especially when the subject is in sharp focus while the background is noticeably out-of-focus—the technique is known as bokeh.

Deep focus and deep space 
When deep focus is used, filmmakers often combine it with deep space (also called deep staging). Deep space is a part of mise-en-scène, placing significant actors and props in different planes of the picture. Directors and cinematographers may use deep space without using deep focus, being either an artistic choice or because they do not have resources to create a deep focus look, or both.

Directors may use deep focus in only some scenes or even just some shots. Other auteurs choose to use it consistently throughout the movie, either as a stylistic choice or because they believe it represents reality better. Filmmakers such as Akira Kurosawa, Stanley Kubrick, Kenji Mizoguchi, Orson Welles, Masahiro Shinoda, Akio Jissoji, Terry Gilliam, Jean Renoir, Jacques Tati, James Wong Howe, and Gregg Toland all used deep focus as part of their signature style.

For French film critic André Bazin, deep-focus visual style was central to his theory of realism in film. He elaborated in an analysis of how deep focus functions in a scene from Wyler's The Best Years of Our Lives:

Deep focus and different formats 
The choice of shooting format affects how easy it would be to achieve a deep focus look. This is because the size of the sensor or film gauge dictates what particular lens focal length would be used in order to achieve a desired viewing angle. Smaller sensors or film gauges will require an overall range of shorter focal lengths to achieve any desired viewing angle than larger sensors or film gauges. Because depth of field is a characteristic of lens focal length (in addition to aperture and focus distance setting), it is easier to achieve a deep-focus look with a smaller imaging sensor or film gauge. For example, a 40mm lens will give a 30-degree horizontal angle of view in the Super35 format. To achieve the same viewing angle with a 1/2" 16:9 sensor, you would need a 13mm lens. A 13mm lens inherently has much more depth-of-field than a 40mm lens.  To achieve the same depth of field with a 40mm lens would require a very small aperture, which in turn would require far more light, and therefore time and expense.

Some filmmakers make deliberate use of the deep-focus capabilities of digital formats. Miami Vice (Michael Mann, 2006), a movie that was shot digitally early in the conversion from film to digital formats, made use of this capability. Cinematographer Dion Beebe commented:
We also decided that there were attributes of HD technology we liked and wanted to exploit, like the increased depth of field. Because of the cameras' chip size (2/3"), they have excessive depth of field that we decided not to fight, but rather utilize.

Split-focus diopter 
In the 1970s, directors made frequent use of the split-focus diopter. With this invention it was possible to have one plane in focus in one part of the picture and a different plane in focus in the other half of the picture. This was and still is very useful for the anamorphic widescreen format, which has less depth of field.

A split diopter is half convex glass that attaches in front of the camera's main lens to make half the lens nearsighted. The lens can focus on a plane in the background and the diopter on a foreground. A split diopter does not create real deep focus, only the illusion of this. What distinguishes it from traditional deep focus is that there is not continuous depth of field from foreground to background; the space between the two sharp objects is out of focus. Because split focus diopters only cover half the lens, shots in which they are used are characterized by a blurred line between the two planes in focus.

The diopter gave the opportunity for spectacular deep focus-compositions that would have been impossible to achieve otherwise. In the American New Wave, director Brian De Palma explored the possibilities of the split-focus diopter extensively, as did other '70s films such as Robert Wise's The Andromeda Strain and Star Trek: The Motion Picture.

Use in modern films 
Starting in the 1980s, American cinema has developed a trend that film scholar David Bordwell calls intensified continuity. Bordwell claims that:
 The average length of each shot in a film has become shorter over the years
 Scenes are built up by closer framing
 More extreme focal lengths are used
 The scenes include an increased number of camera moves

This trend has led to deep focus becoming less common in Hollywood movies. As mentioned in Bordwell's second point, master shots where two or more characters hold a conversation have gone out of fashion, lessening the need for deep focus. In a contemporary Hollywood movie a dialogue scene may consist only of tight close-ups, with the master shot abandoned. If more than one plane in the image contains narrative information, filmmakers switch focus ("rack focusing") instead of keeping both focal planes sharp. In addition, modern sets tend to have less lighting for more comfortable working conditions, and use of deep focus tends to require more light.

The development of intensified continuity may be due to directors' desire to capture the action or dialogue from many different angles and views.  Getting these shots is called coverage. The U.S. film critic Dave Kehr explains it this way:
If there is a single word that sums up the difference between filmmaking at the middle of the 20th century and the filmmaking of today, it is "coverage". Derived from television, it refers to the increasingly common practice of using multiple cameras for a scene (just as television would cover a football game).

To stage a whole scene in one shot is no longer common. Director Steven Soderbergh claims:
That kind of staging is a lost art, which is too bad. The reason they no longer work that way is because it means making choices, real choices, and sticking to them. (...) That's not what people do now. They want all the options they can get in the editing room. An extreme case of filming in one-shot is the feature-length film, Russian Ark (2002), recorded in one take.

Notable uses 
The following films and television programs contain notable examples of deep-focus photography:

Black and white 
 Foolish Wives (1922)
 Nosferatu (1922)
 Greed (1924)
 All Quiet on the Western Front (1930)
 Mad Love (1935)
 Dodsworth (1936)
 Osaka Elegy (1936)
 Dead End (1937)
 La Grande Illusion (1937)
 La Règle du Jeu (1939)
 The Hunchback of Notre Dame (1939) 
 Rebecca (1940)
 Citizen Kane (1941)
 The Devil and Daniel Webster (1941)
 The Magnificent Ambersons (1942)
 The Stranger (1946)
 The Best Years of Our Lives (1946)
 The Lady from Shanghai (1947)
 Oliver Twist (1948)
 Macbeth (1948)
 Drunken Angel (1948)
 The Third Man (1949)
 All the King's Men (1949)
 Stray Dog (1949)
 Late Spring (1949)
 Rashomon (1950)
 Sunset Boulevard (1950)
 Strangers on a Train (1951)
 Detective Story (1951)
 Ugetsu (1953)
 Tokyo Story (1953)
 Sansho the Bailiff (1954)
 The Crucified Lovers (1954)
 Seven Samurai (1954)
 Mr. Arkadin (1955)
 The Night of the Hunter (1955)
 The Killing (1956)
 Throne of Blood (1957)
 Tokyo Twilight (1957)
 12 Angry Men (1957)
 Paths of Glory (1957)
 Sweet Smell of Success (1957)
 3:10 to Yuma (1957)
 Touch of Evil (1958)
 L'Avventura (1960)
 Psycho (1960)
 The Bad Sleep Well (1960)
 La Notte (1961)
 The Hustler (1961)
 The Innocents (1961)
 Yojimbo (1961)
 Cape Fear (1962)
 Knife in the Water (1962)
 L'Eclisse (1962)
 Birdman of Alcatraz (1962)
 The Manchurian Candidate (1962)
 Two for the Seesaw (1962)
 The Trial (1962)
 Hud (1963)
 High and Low (1963)
 The Haunting (1963)
 Seven Days in May (1964)
 The Train (1964)
 Repulsion (1965)
 Chimes at Midnight (1965)
 Red Beard (1965)
 Nayak (1966)
 Cul-de-sac (1966)
 Persona (1966)
 Seconds (1966)
 Faces (1968)
 The Last Picture Show (1971)
 Paper Moon (1973)
 The Good German (2006)

Color 
 The Man Who Knew Too Much (1956)
 The Bridge on the River Kwai (1957)
 Vertigo (1958)
 North by Northwest (1959)
 Ben Hur (1959)
 Floating Weeds (1959)
 How the West Was Won (1962)
 Lawrence of Arabia (1962)
 The Birds (1963)
 A Fistful of Dollars (1964)
 The Ipcress File (1965)
 For a Few Dollars More (1965)
 The Good, the Bad and the Ugly (1966)
 The Appaloosa (1966)
 Rosemary's Baby (1968)
 The Wild Bunch (1969)
 A Clockwork Orange (1971)
 Macbeth (1971)
 The Offence (1972)
 Aguirre, the Wrath of God (1972)
 Chinatown (1974)
 Jeanne Dielman, 23 quai du Commerce, 1080 Bruxelles (1975)
 Barry Lyndon (1975)
 Jaws (1975)
 All the President's Men (1976)
 The Tenant (1976)
 Close Encounters of the Third Kind (1977)
 Nosferatu the Vampyre (1979)
 The Shining (1980)
 Blow Out (1981)
 Fitzcarraldo (1982)
 Rumble Fish (1983)
 Brazil (1985)
 Full Metal Jacket (1987)
 Jurassic Park (1993)
 Casino (1995)
 Saving Private Ryan (1998)
 Eyes Wide Shut (1999)
 Songs from the Second Floor (2000)
 The Pianist (2002)
 Peter Pan (2003)
 Harry Potter and the Prisoner of Azkaban (2004)
 The New World (2005)
 Six Feet Under (2001–2005)
 The Black Dahlia (2006)
 The History Boys (2006)
 Zodiac (2007)
 You, the Living (2007)
 The Ghost Writer (2010)
 Carnage (2011)
 A Pigeon Sat on a Branch Reflecting on Existence (2014)
 It Follows (2014)
 The Hateful Eight (2015)
 Ouija: Origin of Evil (2016)
 Suspiria (2018)
 Us (2019)

See also 
Group f/64
Hyperfocal distance

References

Further reading 

Photographic techniques
Cinematography